The product flow diagram (PFD) is a representation of the order by which a sequence of products is created according to product-based planning principles. It is related to the product breakdown structure (PBS).

The product flow diagram is a prescribed activity of the PRINCE2 project management methodology which mandates the use of product-based planning.

Features 
Some important features of the product flow diagram (PFD) include:

 The PFD is a planning aid, not an outcome of planning (like a PERT chart which looks similar), this is a common cause of confusion among the project managers
 The PFD should contain all of the products of the product breakdown structure (equivalent to a work breakdown structure)
 The PFD should be kept as simple and high-level as possible for it to make sense (if additional detail is required, creating a supplementary, detailed product flow diagram can be useful)
 All products should be 'linked into' the product flow diagram, even if it's only to the start and the finish products
 Tt is vital not to get too 'hung up' on nuances such as the nature of each logical linkage in setting up a product flow diagram

The product flow diagram is typically created iteratively with product descriptions and the product breakdown structure because as a project manager works through the logic they will identify missing products and additional information about products.

See also 
 Product breakdown structure
 Work breakdown structure

References

External links 
 Product Flow Diagram in PRINCE2 wiki

Project management techniques
PRINCE2